Nehlle Pe Dehlla (earlier titled as Jimmy and Johny) is a 2007 Indian Hindi language action comedy film directed by Ajay Chandok, and starring Saif Ali Khan, Sanjay Dutt, Bipasha Basu and Kim Sharma. It was filmed in 2001, but was not premiered until 2 March 2007.

The film was panned by critics.

Synopsis
Johny (Sanjay Dutt) and Jimmy (Saif Ali Khan) are small-time crooks who dream of becoming rich. They in jail, where they regularly end for their misdeeds. A hotel manager, Ballu (Shakti Kapoor), embezzles his company's 300,000,000 rupees. Johny and Jimmy come to know about it and plan to blackmail him. They join the hotel as waiters and are waiting for the perfect opportunity. But a terrible mobster trio (Mukesh Rishi, Aashif Sheikh and Shiva Rindani) kill Ballu. When Johny and Jimmy find Ballu dead, they take his body and present him as alive. They keep doing it until they find the real culprit. Johnny meets Ballu's niece, Puja (Bipasha Basu), and Jimmy meets her friend (Kim Sharma). They all fall in love, and once they find the real culprit, corpse and a map to direct the money, they all go on a chase to find the money, with the three mobsters after them also heading for the money. They arrive, only to find the mobsters have already been there and taken the money. They reach the mobsters' hideouts and take the money. The three then come to meet Jimmy and Johny, and since they do not give them the money, the three kidnap Puja. Jimmy and Johny go to rescue her, by giving the money to the mobsters. There is a brawl and, eventually, the police enters. The three mobsters are arrested, Johny and Puja marry, as are Jimmy and Puja's friend, and live a happy and clean life with her uncle's money.

Cast
 Sanjay Dutt .... Johnny
 Saif Ali Khan .... Jimmy
 Bipasha Basu .... Pooja
 Shakti Kapoor .... Balram Sahni (Balu)
 Kim Sharma .... Kim (Pooja's friend)
 Mukesh Rishi .... Dilher
 Daman Maan .... Inspector
 Avtar Gill .... Ram Prasad Gupta
 Shiva Rindani .... Jazzy
 Aasif Sheikh .... Hansa
 Supriya Karnik .... Special Appearance as Matha Ji
 Neha Dhupia .... Special Appearance in end credits song 'Parvar Digara'
 Ganesh Acharya .... Special Appearance in song 'Imaan Dol Jaayenge'

Soundtrack
"Nehle Pe Dehla" (Shaan/Kunal Ganjawala)
"Husn Husn" (Shaan, Jaspinder Narula and Sonu Nigam), Music- Anand Raj Anand
"Parvar Digara" (Tulsi Kumar and K.K.), Music- Pritam
"Parvar Digara Remix" (Tulsi Kumar and K.K.), Music- Pritam, Remix - DJ Suketu & Aks
"Hoga Hoga Khuda Gawah" (Zubeen Garg), Music- Dj Suketu & Aks
"Nehlle Pe Dehlla (Hum To Bas Deewane Hai)" (Shaan)
"Bottle Mein Main" (Vinod Rathod, Abhijeet Bhattacharya and Sunidhi Chauhan), Music-  Daboo Malik
"Neeli Neeli Aankhon Wali" (Mika Singh, Tarannum Mallik)
"Dil Jane"
"Imaan Dol Jaayenge" (Sunidhi Chauhan and Vinod Rathod) Music- Anand Raj Anand

Reception
The BBC wrote a scathing review of the film, describing it as a "farce from beginning to end". Taran Adarsh called it a "poor show all the way".

References

External links

2007 films
2000s Hindi-language films
2007 action comedy films
2000s comedy thriller films
Films scored by Anand Raj Anand
Indian action thriller films
Films shot in Mauritius
2007 action thriller films
Indian comedy thriller films
Indian crime comedy films
2007 comedy films
2000s crime comedy films